Richard Thomas Eason  (20 November 1913 – 13 November 1979) was an Australian rules footballer who played with Footscray and Essendon in the Victorian Football League (VFL).

Family
The son of Alexander Eason (1889–1956), and Sarah Isabel "Sadie" Eason (1885–1950), née Huggett, Richard Thomas Eason was born at Geelong on 20 November 1913.

His father, Alec, and his uncle, William Eason (1882–1957), were both VFL players and VFL coaches.

He married Mary Hemingway in 1939. They had three children.

Football

Footscray (VFL)
Having trained with Footscray in the 1934 pre-season, he was cleared to Footscray from the Footscray Technical School Old Boys Football Club in the Victorian Amateur Football Association (VAFA) on 26 April 1935.

Essendon (VFL)
One of four players granted a "surprise clearance" from Footscray on 22 June 1937, Eason was granted a permit by the VFL to transfer to Essendon on 23 June 1937.

He played in a number of Second XVIII matches for Essendon, and played in two First XVIII matches: against Melbourne, at the MCG, on 17 July 1937, and in the last home-and-away match of the 1937 season, against South Melbourne, at the Lake Oval, on 28 August 1937, as a replacement for the injured Elton Plummer.

Footscray TSOB (VAFA)
He received a permit to return to play for the Footscray TSOB Football Club in the VAFA on 24 April 1939.

Military service
Eason enlisted in the 2nd AIF in November 1939 and served in Libya, Greece, Crete and later Papua New Guinea during World War II.

He was awarded the Military Cross for "outstanding courage and coolness" at Arohemi, near Wewak, in East Sepik Province, New Guinea on 5 March 1945 when he went within 50 metres of the enemy to bring artillery fire to bear. He fought in a grenade battle against Japanese troops for 12 hours, during which 11 of his escort party were killed or wounded.

After the war he went on to become a Brigadier in Australian Army Reserve.

Country Fire Authority
On 1 September 1965 he was appointed for a five-year term as the first permanent Chairman of the Country Fire Authority, and was re-appointed, for a second five-year term, on 1 September 1970.

Death
He died at Sandringham, Victoria on 13 November 1979.

Notes

References
 
 
 Maplestone, M., Flying Higher: History of the Essendon Football Club 1872–1996, Essendon Football Club, (Melbourne), 1996. 
 World War Two Nominal Roll: Captain Richard Thomas Eason (352005/VX998), Department of Veterans' Affairs.
 Military Cross: Captain R T Eason, 2/2 Field Regiment, Royal Australian Artillery, collection of the Australian War Memorial.

External links 

1913 births
1979 deaths
Military personnel from Victoria (Australia)
Australian rules footballers from Geelong
Western Bulldogs players
Essendon Football Club players
Australian Army personnel of World War II
Australian brigadiers
Australian recipients of the Military Cross
Australian people of English descent